Catherine A. Labonte Cloutier (born July 25, 1950) is an American politician and a former Republican member of the Delaware Senate from January 9, 2001, to January 12, 2021, representing District 5. Cloutier served in the Delaware House of Representatives from 1999 to 2001, after taking over the seat when her husband, former Lieutenant Governor of Delaware candidate Philip D. Cloutier, died in office in 1998. Senator Cloutier served as the minority whip in the 150th General Assembly.

Elections
In 1998, Cloutier was unopposed for the House District 11 Republican primary and won the general election with 4,584 votes (72.9%) against Democratic nominee Michael Paul.
In 2000, Cloutier won the Republican primary for Senate District 5 with 1,529 votes (68.6%), and won the general election with 8,099 votes (52.2%) against Democratic nominee William McGlinchey.
In 2002, Cloutier was unopposed for both the Republican primary and the general election, winning with 9,446 votes.
In 2006, Cloutier was unopposed for the Republican primary and won the general election with 6,945 votes (52.6%) against Democratic nominee Patricia Morrison.
In 2010, Cloutier was unopposed in the Republican primary and won the general election with 7,814 votes (54.9%) against Democratic nominee Christopher Counihan. Cloutier also qualified and received votes as the Working Families Party candidate.
In 2012, Cloutier and Counihan were both unopposed for their primaries, setting up a rematch of their 2010 race. Cloutier won the general election with 12,912 votes (56.2%) over Counihan.
In 2016, Cloutier was unopposed for the Republican primary and won the general election with 13,407 votes (59.5%) against Democratic nominee Denise Bowers.
In 2020, Cloutier was defeated by Democratic nominee Kyle Evans Gay.

References

External links
Official page at the Delaware General Assembly
Campaign site
 

1950 births
Living people
Republican Party Delaware state senators
Republican Party members of the Delaware House of Representatives
Women state legislators in Delaware
20th-century American women politicians
20th-century American politicians
21st-century American women politicians
21st-century American politicians
People from New Castle County, Delaware
Politicians from Springfield, Massachusetts